The Men's individual pursuit LC2 track cycling event at the 2008 Summer Paralympics was competed on 8 September. It was won by Jirí Ježek, representing .

Qualifying

8 Sept. 2008, 10:30

Final round

8 Sept. 2008, 15:50
Gold

Bronze

References

M